Michel Louis Coloni (25 August 1927 – 6 July 2016) was a Catholic bishop.

Ordained to the priesthood in 1954, Coloni was named auxiliary bishop of the Archdiocese of Paris, France and titular of Oea, in 1982. In 1989, he was named bishop of the Roman Catholic Diocese of Dijon. From 2002 until 2004, he served as archbishop of the Archdiocese of Dijon.

References 

1927 births
2016 deaths
Bishops of Dijon